Ostrava Zoo, (Zoologická zahrada Ostrava) is a zoo, located in Ostrava in the Czech Republic.

Ostrava Zoo was founded as Kunčičky Zoo in 1951, on an area called the Miners' Park in Ostrava-Kunčičky. But already in 1956 construction of the new zoo in Stromovka park was undertaken, and in 1960 the zoo and animals were transferred to Stromovka park.

In 1996 Ostrava Zoo became a member in the European Association of Zoos and Aquaria (EAZA). Ostrava Zoo is open every day from 9:00 a.m. until 6:00 p.m.

References

External links

Zoos in the Czech Republic
Buildings and structures in Ostrava
Zoos established in 1951
1951 establishments in Czechoslovakia
20th-century architecture in the Czech Republic